Radhanagari is a town and the headquarters of Radhanagari tehsil in the Radhanagari subdivision of Kolhapur district in the Indian state of Maharashtra.  It is located on the banks of the Bhogawati River, near the Radhanagari Dam and the Radhanagari Wildlife Sanctuary.

Transport
Nearby Excursions Dajipur reserve forest full of biodiversity.
Nearby Cities Kolhapur

Places to visit
Radhanagri Dam
Kalammawadi Dam

Cities and towns in Kolhapur district
Talukas in Maharashtra